Utricularia letestui is a small, probably annual, carnivorous plant that belongs to the genus Utricularia. It is endemic to the Central African Republic and is only known from three collections. It was originally described and published by Peter Taylor in 1989. It was named in honor of the French collector G. Le Testu.

See also 
 List of Utricularia species

References

External links
 

Carnivorous plants of Africa
letestui
Endemic flora of the Central African Republic